Steve Kreider (born May 12, 1958) is an American football quarterback and a wide receiver who played eight seasons in the National Football League for the Cincinnati Bengals.

History
Kreider was born in Reading, Pennsylvania.  He attended Schuylkill Valley High School in Leesport, Pennsylvania, and played high school football for the Schuylkill Valley Panthers. After high school, he attended Lehigh University. In 1977, Kreider was named a Division II All-American, catching 53 passes for 1,181 yards and 12 touchdowns.  He went on to catch another 9 passes for 171 yards and four touchdowns in a postseason match against the University of Massachusetts, as Lehigh went on to win the Division II National Championship.   He finished his college career with 118 reception for 2,159 yards and 24 touchdowns and was entered into Lehigh's athletic hall of fame in 1995.

Kreider was a sixth-round draft pick by the Cincinnati Bengals in 1979.  He was a member of the 1981 AFC championship team, receiving 37 passes and gaining a total of 520 yards and 5 touchdowns for the season. It was the Bengals' first Super Bowl appearance; however, they lost Super Bowl XVI to Joe Montana and the San Francisco 49ers, 26–21. Kreider was released from the Bengals after the 1988 season. During his time in the NFL, he earned a PhD in finance from the University of Cincinnati.

References

</noinclude>

1958 births
Living people
Sportspeople from Reading, Pennsylvania
American football wide receivers
Lehigh Mountain Hawks football players
Cincinnati Bengals players
Players of American football from Pennsylvania
University of Cincinnati alumni